Girls' High School was one of seven schools opened in 1872 as part of the original public school system in Atlanta, Georgia, United States.

Girls' High began in the John Neal/William Lyon Mansion, used by General William T. Sherman as his headquarters during his occupation of Atlanta. The site of the mansion at Mitchell and Washington Streets is now occupied by City Hall.

A superb school academically, Girls' High was the only public high school in Atlanta exclusively for girls. Seventy-one girls received diplomas from the school at the graduation exercises in May 1911. In 1919, two graduates received scholarships for Barnard College.

In 1925, Girls' High School moved into one of 18 new buildings in the 14th district, paid for by a massive bond issue. The school boasted the following amenities:
104 rooms including science halls, laboratories, a business department, sewing rooms, a library, an art department, music room, and outdoor classrooms on the third level
A model apartment containing a living/dining room, bedroom, bath and kitchenette
20 classrooms and individual offices for 39 teachers
A school bank cage, part of the business department, which encouraged the girls to save and simultaneously  gave them an opportunity to learn the banking business

In 1947, Atlanta high schools became co-educational. Renamed Roosevelt High School for Franklin Delano Roosevelt, Girls' High School continued until 1985, when it was combined with Hoke Smith Technical School. A new school building was established on Glenwood Avenue, just below the old school buildings, where it still stands. Since then, the original building has been converted into an apartment complex.

Notable alumni
 Corinne Stocker Horton (1871-1947), elocutionist, journalist, newspaper editor, and clubwoman

References

Public high schools in Georgia (U.S. state)
Schools in Atlanta